Valerie Barsom (born November 11, 1960) is an American attorney and politician who served as a member of the Massachusetts House of Representatives for the 13th Hampden district from 1993 to 1996.

Early life and education 
Barsom was born in Springfield, Massachusetts. She earned a Bachelor of Arts degree in government from Clark University in 1982 and a Juris Doctor from New England Law Boston in 1991.

Career 
Barsom was elected to the Massachusetts House of Representatives in 1992 and assumed office in 1993. She withdrew from re-election in 1996 to accept a position as legal counsel of the Massachusetts Turnpike Authority. She started her own legal practice in 1997.

References

External links 
Law Offices of Valerie Barsom

American women lawyers
American lawyers
Living people
Massachusetts lawyers
Women state legislators in Massachusetts
Members of the Massachusetts House of Representatives
Clark University alumni
New England Law Boston alumni
21st-century American women
1960 births
People from Springfield, Massachusetts